Sings the Songs of Dallas Frazier is an album by American country music artist George Jones. It was released in 1968 on the Musicor Records label.

Background
All the songs on the album are written by Dallas Frazier. Jones had scored several hits with Frazier's songs, such as "If My Heart Had Windows" and "Say It's Not You", and the most surprising thing about this record is that none of the songs have appeared on any previous album, considering the label's constant recycling and repackaging of Jones's material.  The list of musicians on the album is unavailable, but many sources state that producer Pappy Daily very often used guitarist Zane Ashton (aka Bill Aken) among other musicians on a regular basis.  This was further reinforced by the fact that both Frazier and Ashton did many sessions at Richie Podolor's American Recording Studio.  Jones would also record an album on Musicor called George Jones Sings the Great Songs of Leon Payne, which uses similar artwork.

Sings the Songs of Dallas Frazier reached number 14 on the country albums chart while the album's opening track, "I Can't Get There From Here", would rise to number five on the country singles chart.

Reception
Writing for AllMusic, Chris Woodstra contends that "while the big production numbers, complete with back-up by the Jordanaires, may put off some country purists, the album serves as a true testament to both the singer and the songwriter."

Track listing
All tracks composed by Dallas Frazier
"I Can't Get There from Here" – 2:25
"Looking for My Feel Good" – 2:14
"When Love Was Green" – 2:12
"Hangin' On to One and Hangin' Round the Other" – 2:25
"Half of Me Is Gone" – 2:37
"Honky Tonk Downstairs" – 2:29
"My Baby Left Her Jinglin' John for Foldin' Fred" – 2:33
"The Girl I Almost Knew" – 2:44
"There Ain't No Grave Deep Enough" – 2:04
"There's Nothing Left for You" – 2:14

External links
George Jones' Official Website

1968 albums
George Jones albums
Albums produced by Pappy Daily
Musicor Records albums